Badengan, also rendered as Badangun or Badengun or Bademgum, may refer to:
 Badengan-e Olya
 Badengan-e Sofla